is a former Japanese football player and manager he is the current assistant manager of Sagan Tosu.

Playing career
Katafuchi was born in Saga Prefecture on April 29, 1975. After graduating from Tokai University, he joined Japan Football League club Sagan Tosu based in his local in 1998. The club was promoted to new league J2 League from 1999. On March 28, 1999, he score a hat-trick against Consadole Sapporo. He became the first player in J2 League to score a hat-trick. Although he became a regular player in 2000, he could not play many matches for right knee injury in 2001. In 2002, he moved to J2 club Albirex Niigata. However he could hardly play in the match and retired end of 2002 season.

Coaching career
After retirement, Katafuchi started coaching career at Albirex Niigata in 2003. He coached for youth team until 2015. In 2016, he became a top team coach under manager Tatsuma Yoshida. However the club results were bad in 2016 and Yoshida was sacked in September. Katafuchi became a new manager as Yoshida successor. He managed the club until end of 2016 season and the club remained in J1 League. In 2017, he returned to a coach under new manager Fumitake Miura. However the club results were bad again and Miura was sacked in May. Katafuchi managed the club as caretaker until the club signed with new manager Wagner Lopes. In August 2018, he became a manager as Masakazu Suzuki successor. In April 2019, Katafuchi was sacked.

Club statistics

Managerial statistics

References

External links
 
 

1975 births
Living people
Tokai University alumni
Association football people from Saga Prefecture
Japanese footballers
J2 League players
Japan Football League (1992–1998) players
Sagan Tosu players
Albirex Niigata players
Japanese football managers
J1 League managers
J2 League managers
Albirex Niigata managers
Association football forwards